The Long Island Electric Railway was a streetcar company operating in Brooklyn, Queens, and Nassau County, New York, United States between 1894 and 1926. The company was partially owned by the Long Island Consolidated Electric Companies, a holding company for the Long Island Rail Road and partially by August Belmont and the Interborough Rapid Transit Company. It connected the east end of the Fulton Street El at Crescent Street station in City Line, Brooklyn with Jamaica, Queens, and ran from there to the Nassau County line at Queens Village and to Far Rockaway, Queens via Nassau County. It also had a connection to Belmont Park. The New York and Long Island Traction Company used trackage rights over its line from Crescent Street to Queens Village.

Both Long Island Electric and the New York and Long Island Traction Companies went bankrupt in 1926, following a fire that destroyed the companies' barn facility in 1924. However while trolley service was no longer available for Nassau County, the LIER was reorganized and reestablished as the Jamaica Central Railways, which ran both buses and trolleys for the next six years, and buses exclusively for the rest of the 20th Century as Jamaica Buses until it was acquired by the MTA Bus Company in 2006.

References

Further reading
 Story of the Long Island Electric Railway and the Jamaica Central Railways, 1894-1933, Internet Archive
Lost Trolleys of Queens and Long Island by Stephen L. Meyers

Streetcar lines in Brooklyn
Streetcar lines in Queens, New York
Streetcar lines on Long Island
Railway companies established in 1894
Railway companies disestablished in 1926
Companies affiliated with the Long Island Rail Road
Predecessors and affiliates of the Interborough Rapid Transit Company

Defunct public transport operators in the United States
Defunct New York (state) railroads
1894 establishments in New York (state)
American companies established in 1894
1926 disestablishments in New York (state)
American companies disestablished in 1926